"Reno Bound" is a song written by John McFee and Andre Pessis, and recorded by American country music group Southern Pacific.  It was released in April 1986 as the third single from the album Southern Pacific.  The song reached number 9 on the Billboard Hot Country Singles & Tracks chart.

Personnel
Keith Knudsen – drums, percussion, background vocals
John McFee – lead guitar, harmonica, background vocals
Tim Goodman – lead vocals, rhythm guitar, synthesizer
Glen D. Hardin – piano, synthesizer, background vocals
Jerry Scheff – bass guitar, background vocals

Chart performance

References

1986 singles
Southern Pacific (band) songs
Song recordings produced by Jim Ed Norman
Songs written by John McFee
Warner Records singles
1986 songs
Songs written by Andre Pessis